INS Kulish is a , currently in active service with the Indian Navy. She was ordered in October 1994 and was laid in October 1995. She was launched in August 1997 and was commissioned on 20 August 2001.

Kulish is the third of the four Kora-class corvettes designed under Project25A. She is armed with the P-15 Termit anti-ship missiles and Strela-2 anti-air missiles.

Etymology 
The word Kulish is of sanskrit origin and translates to thunderbolt. It is the name of a mythological weapon of Lord Indra.

Design

Armament 
INS Kulish is primarily designed as a surface combatant. The anti-air defence is provided by two mobile shoulder based Strela-2 SAM systems. It is fitted with an Otobreda  main gun while two AK-630  guns act as CIWS. In addition, the ship carries one HAL Chetak or HAL Dhruv helicopter.

Construction 
The Naval Design Bureau under Project 25A designed the Kora-class corvettes. Her keel was laid in October 1995 and she was launched in August 1997 before being commissioned on 20 August 2001 by the then Governor of West Bengal, Viren J. Shah at Kolkata.

During the commissioning ceremony, the Governor of West Bengal stressed the need for development of indigenous defence equipment. The Flag Officer Commander-in-Chief of the navy's Eastern Naval Command John C. DeSilva said "INS Kulish, suited for picket duties, would act as an effective sentinel in the Eastern Command in the Indian Maritime zone".

Operational history 
INS Kulish visited the Shanghai naval base in 2003 as part of a three-vessel fleet, for a five-day official visit. The fleet was commanded by flag officer Rear Admiral R. P. Suthan of India's Eastern Naval Command. It comprised a guided missile destroyer , a fleet tanker  and Kulish. The fleet held airborne and surface search and rescue exercises with China's East Sea Fleet, which were code-named "Dolphin 0311". Before the joint exercise, the Chinese and Indian ships also conducted maritime communication and formation manoeuvres. These were the first joint naval exercises between China and India. The fleet left Shanghai on 14 November 2003.

In May 2010, the navy's Eastern Fleet deployed INS Kulish, along with guided-missile destroyers  and INS Ranjit and fleet tanker INS Jyoti from Port Blair to South East Asia, where the fleet undertook passage exercises with the navies of Indonesia, Singapore and Australia. The fleet sailed under the command of Flag Officer Commanding, Eastern Fleet, Rear Admiral P N Murugesan and made port calls at Jakarta (Indonesia), Hai Phong (Vietnam), Manila (Philippines), Muara (Brunei), Bangkok (Thailand), Fremantle (Australia), Singapore and Port Kelang (Malaysia). At Port Kelang, the fleet conducted anti-piracy exercises with the Royal Malaysian Navy from 20 to 23 June, and left port on 23 June.

The other ships which participated in the exercise included Carrier Strike Group (CSG) 1 of the US Navy, comprising , embarked Carrier Air Wing (CVW) 17,  guided-missile cruiser  and  guided-missile destroyer . Military Sealift Command's fast combat support ship  also provided support for the exercise.

INS Kulish along with INS Rana participated in the Navy Day celebrations in December 2011 when it was commanded by Lieutenant Commander Rajneesh Dalal. Both the ships hosted more than 1,200 people who came to watch the programme in commemoration of Navy Day. Kulish was part of the seven ships that took part in the programme in commemoration of Navy Day 2013. The other ships included the amphibious transport dock , guided missile destroyer INS Ranvijay, frigates ,  and corvettes , .

Kulish was part of a seven-ship fleet which represented the Eastern Naval Command at Indian Navy's annual TROPEX exercise, which concluded on 1 March 2013. TROPEX 2013 was a month-long theatre level exercise which was conducted off India's west coast. The navy conducted manoeuvres, weapon firings and tactical evaluation. This flotilla made a port call at Kochi on 4 March 2013, en route to its forward deployment.

Gallery

References 

Kora-class corvettes
Corvettes of the Indian Navy
Naval ships of India
1997 ships
Ships built in India